Anisolabididae is a family of earwigs, in the suborder Forficulina and the order Dermaptera. It is one of nine families in the suborder Forficulina, and contains thirty-eight genera spread across thirteen subfamilies.

Subfamilies
The family contains the following subfamilies:

 Anisolabidinae (contains 25 genera, cited by both Srivastava and Chen & Ma. Steinmann in 1986, 1989, 1990, and 1993 classified the genera under the subfamilies Carcinophorinae and Gonolabiinae, which are synonyms of Anisolabidinae. Other synonyms include Placolabidinae and Titanolabiinae. The genera in this subfamily are Aborolabis, Anisolabella, Anisolabis, Apolabis, Capralabis, Carcinophora, Epilabis, Epilandex, Euborellia, Flexiolabis, Foramenolabis, Gonolabis, Mongolabis, Placolabis, Gonolabina, Gonolabis, Heterolabis, Indolabis, Metalabis, Neolabis, Ornatolabis, Paraflexiolabis, Thekalabis, Titanolabis, and Zacheria)
 Anophthalmolabiinae (contains one genus, Anophthalmolabis, cited by both Steinmann and Srivastava)
 Antisolabiinae (contains one genus, Antisolabis, cited by both Steinmann and Srivastava)
 Brachylabinae (contains three genera: Brachylabis, Ctenisolabis, Metisolabis. Ctenisolabis and Metisolabis were cited by both Steinmann and Srivastava, while Brachylabis was cited by Steinmann, Srivastava, and Chen & Ma)
 Idolopsalinae (contains one genus, Idolopsalis, cited by both Steinmann and Srivastava)
 Isolabiinae (contains four genera: Africolabis, Geracodes, Isolabis, and Pterolabis, cited only by Steinmann)
 Parisolabiinae (contains two genera, Parisolabis and Parisopsalis. They were cited by both Steinmann and Srivastava)
 Platylabiinae (contains one genus, Platylabia, cited by Steinmann, Srivastava, and Chen & Ma)

Incertae sedis:

The genus †Toxolabis was described in 2014 from a single fossil male recovered from Burmese amber.  The single species T. zigrasi matches that of Anisolabididae members.  Due to the quality of the preservation, the describing authors were not able to be determine a more specific placement within the family. Kotejalabis, Cretolabia and Cratoborellia are known from the Aptian aged Crato Formation of Brazil.

References

External links 
 The Earwig Research Centre's Anisolabididae database Instructions: type Anisolabididae in the "family" field and click "search".
 A drawing of the species Titanolabis colossea

 
Dermaptera families